Agnes of Eltham (1498–1530) was an English woman, allegedly the illegitimate daughter of Princess Bridget of York.

Agnes of Eltham, later Agnes Langstroth, was an orphan and ward of the Dartford Priory in Dartford, Kent. Agnes left the Priory in 1514 and married Adam Langstroth (1490-1549), the head of a landed family in Yorkshire (the ancestral home of the Yorks and refuge of York loyalists in the early Tudor period) with 'a considerable dowry'. She had at least one son, Christopher Langstroth.

Agnes was an orphan and ward of the Dartford Priory in Dartford, Kent at a time when the Priory was also the home of Princess Bridget of York, younger sister to Elizabeth, queen consort to Henry VII and daughter of Edward IV of England and Elizabeth Woodville, who patronized Agnes by providing for her financial needs until her death in 1507.

References

1498 births
1530 deaths
House of York
People from Dartford
People from Eltham
16th-century English women